Villagers Worcester Rugby Football Club – known as One Logix United Bulk Villagers Worcester for sponsorship reasons – is an amateur rugby union club based in Worcester, South Africa. They are a member of the Boland Rugby Union and can provide players to the  provincial team and the  URC Rugby team.

Origins

The club was founded in 1883 in Worcester and is one of the oldest rugby clubs in South Africa and the oldest from a formerly disadvantaged community.

Achievements

 2012: Villagers Worcester's sevens team won the Boland Union Provincial sevens tournament. Villagers Worcester won the Boland Premier League title in 2012 and represented the union in the inaugural SARU Community Cup competition in 2013, where they finished fourth in Pool A and failed to qualify to the finals tournament in George.
 2014: Villagers Worcester once again win the 2014 Boland Premier League to qualify for the 2015 edition of the SARU Community Cup.

Notable members

Six players from Villagers had the honour of wearing the green and gold of SARU: Johnny Neethling, Isak Neethling, Abe Felix, Maurice Hankey, Christy Noble and Charles January.

In 1931, Schalk du Toit and Alvi van der Merwe were selected to tour with Bennie Osler's Springbok side to the United Kingdom with Van der Merwe playing in the test against Wales. His son Johan became Boland captain and later played for Villagers Worcester.

Wendal Wehr, currently playing with Griquas, also played for Villagers Worcester.

See also

 Boland Cavaliers
 South African Rugby Union
 List of South African rugby union teams
 Gold Cup

References

Sources

 
 Various articles from the Worcester Standard and Advertiser

External links 

 

Gold Cup (rugby union)
Sport in the Western Cape
Rugby clubs established in 1883
South African rugby union teams